The mixed 49er was a sailing event on the Sailing at the 2008 Summer Olympics program in Qingdao International Sailing Centre. Sixteen races (last one a medal race) were scheduled. Only thirteen races were completed including the medal race due to lack of wind. 38 sailors, on 19 boats, from 19 nations competed. Ten boats qualified for the medal race.

Race schedule

Course areas and course configurations 
For the 49er course areas A  (Yellow) and E  (Red) were used. The location (36°1'26"’N, 120°26'52"E) points to the center of the 0.6nm radius Yellow course area and the location (36°2'21"N, 120°25'32"E) points to the center of the 0.6nm radius Red course area. The target time for the course was about 30 minutes for all races. The race management could choose from several lengths of the course configuration.

Windward-Leeward courses 
 W2: START – 1 – 4s/4p – 1 – FINISH
 W3: START – 1 – 4s/4p – 1 – 4s/4p – 1 – FINISH
 W4: START – 1 – 4s/4p – 1 – 4s/4p – 1 – 4s/4p – 1 – FINISH

Weather conditions 
In the lead up to the Olympics many questioned the choice of Qingdao as a venue with very little predicted wind. During the races the wind was pretty light and quite unpredictable. Due to lack of wind (< 1.6 knots) one racing day had to be cancelled and the medal race needed to be postponed to the next day.

Final results

Daily standings

Notes 
The Danish team of Jonas Warrer and Martin Kirketerp Ibsen, who won the gold medal, almost failed to make it to the start of the Medal race, when their mast split shortly before the start. The Croatian team—who had not made the final race—donated their boat to the Danish team to use in the final, and the Danes subsequently went on to win Gold. The Spanish team filed a protest against the win due to the boat change, but the protest was dismissed and the race results stand. The protest was promoted to the International Olympic Committee but was again dismissed. A third protest was promoted by Italy and Spain to the Court of Arbitration for Sport (CAS), which was also dismissed.

Pavle Kostov, Petar Cupać and their coach Ivan Bulaja were rewarded the Pierre de Coubertin medal for lending their boat.

Further reading

References 

Mixed 49er
49er (dinghy)
Unisex sailing at the Summer Olympics